Ulf Nilsson (born 1945) is a Swedish Liberal People's Party politician, member of the Riksdag since 1998.

References

1945 births
Living people
Members of the Riksdag 1998–2002
Members of the Riksdag 2002–2006
Members of the Riksdag 2006–2010
Members of the Riksdag 2010–2014
Members of the Riksdag from the Liberals (Sweden)